Tumor necrosis factor receptor superfamily member 19L is a protein that in humans is encoded by the RELT gene.

Function 

The protein encoded by this gene is a member of the TNF-receptor superfamily. This receptor is especially abundant in hematologic tissues. It has been shown to activate the NF-kappaB pathway and selectively bind TNF receptor-associated factor 1 (TRAF1). This receptor is capable of stimulating T-cell proliferation in the presence of CD3 signaling, which suggests its regulatory role in immune response. Two alternatively spliced transcript variants of this gene encoding the same protein have been reported.

References